An ephemeral port is a communications endpoint (port) of a transport layer protocol of the Internet protocol suite that is used for only a short period of time for the duration of a communication session. Such short-lived ports are allocated automatically within a predefined range of port numbers by the IP stack software of a computer operating system. The Transmission Control Protocol (TCP), the User Datagram Protocol (UDP), and the Stream Control Transmission Protocol (SCTP) typically use an ephemeral port for the client-end of a client–server communication. At the server end of the communication session, ephemeral ports may also be used for continuation of communications with a client that initially connected to one of the services listening with a well-known port. For example, the Trivial File Transfer Protocol (TFTP) and Remote Procedure Call (RPC) applications can behave in this manner.

The allocation of an ephemeral port is temporary and only valid for the duration of the communication session. After completion of the session, the port is destroyed and the port number becomes available for reuse, but many implementations simply increment the last used port number until the ephemeral port range is exhausted, when the numbers roll over. Ephemeral ports are also called dynamic ports, because they are used on a per request basis, and are only known by number once allocated.

Range
The RFC 6056 says that the range for ephemeral ports should be 1024–65535.

The Internet Assigned Numbers Authority (IANA) and RFC 6335 suggests the range 49152–65535 (215 + 214 to 216 − 1) for dynamic or private ports.

Many Linux kernels use the port range 32768–60999. FreeBSD has used the IANA port range since release 4.6. Previous versions, including the Berkeley Software Distribution (BSD), use ports 1024–5000 as ephemeral ports.

Microsoft Windows operating systems through Windows XP use the range 1025–5000 as ephemeral ports by default.  Windows Vista, Windows 7, and Server 2008 use the IANA range by default. Windows Server 2003 uses the range 1025–5000 by default, until Microsoft security update MS08-037 from 2008 is installed, after which it uses the IANA range by default. Windows Server 2008 with Exchange Server 2007 installed has a default port range of 1025–60000. In addition to the default range, all versions of Windows since Windows 2000 have the option of specifying a custom range anywhere within 1025–65535.

Solaris OS uses 32768–65535 range.

AIX OS uses 32768–65535 range.

Configuration characteristics
If certain server software is used, that uses non-ephemeral custom port ranges for initiating some further connections, it needs to be ensured by configuration that this custom port range and the ephemeral port range do not overlap.

See also

Registered port
List of TCP and UDP port numbers

Notes

References

External links
 RFC 6056 Recommendations for Transport-Protocol Port Randomization
 The Ephemeral Port Range at NcFTP.com
 Ephemeral Source Port Selection Strategies at DataPlane.org

Internet Standards
Internet protocols